Chekchek or Chek Chek or Chak Chak may refer to:
 Chekchek, Fars
 Chek Chek, Mohr, Fars Province
 Chekchek, Hormozgan
 Chek Chek-e Shomali, Hormozgan Province
 Chek Chek, Kerman
 Chek Chek, Yazd